A Midsummer Night's Dream is a 1909 American film directed by Charles Kent and J. Stuart Blackton, and starring Walter Ackerman and Charles Chapman. It was the first film adaptation of the eponymous play by William Shakespeare. The movie was made during summer 1909, but not released until December 25.

Plot
The Duke of Athens decrees that Hermia (Rose Tapley) shall forsake Lysander (Maurice Costello) in favour of her father's choice, Demetrius (Walter Ackerman). The lovers elope into the woods, quickly followed by Demetrius and his love, Helena (Julia Swayne Gordon). The town tradesmen, meanwhile, rehearse a play in honour of the duke's betrothal to Hippolyta. Back in the forest, Titania, Queen of Fairies (Florence Turner), quarrels with Penelope, who avenges herself by sending Puck (Gladys Hulette) away with a magic herb, which, dabbed on the eyes of a sleeping person, shall make the "victim" fall in love with the first person to appear after awakening. Soon, Lysander and Demetrius are smitten with the wrong girls and Titania has fallen in love with Bottom, the egotistical leader of the tradesmen, whom Puck has turned into an ass (donkey). When Penelope discovers all this mischief, she lifts the spell and the wedding of the duke and Hippolyta can proceed.

Cast
 Walter Ackerman as Demetrius
 Dolores Costello as a fairy
 Helene Costello as a fairy
 Maurice Costello as Lysander
 Rose Tapley as Hermia
 Julia Swayne Gordon as Helena
 Florence Turner as Titania
 Gladys Hulette as Puck
 Elita Proctor Otis as Hippolyta
 William Humphrey
 William V. Ranous as Bottom
 William Shea as Mechanical
 Charles Chapman as Quince
 Charles Kent as Theseus

References
Notes

Bibliography

Further reading

External links
 
 
 
 
 

1909 films
American black-and-white films
American silent short films
American romantic drama films
American fantasy adventure films
Films based on A Midsummer Night's Dream
Films directed by J. Stuart Blackton
Vitagraph Studios short films
1900s romantic drama films
1900s fantasy adventure films
1909 short films
Articles containing video clips
American fantasy drama films
1900s American films
Silent romantic drama films
Silent adventure films
Silent American drama films